"If Bubba Can Dance (I Can Too)" is a song recorded by American country music group Shenandoah. It was written by Shenandoah drummer, Mike McGuire and lead singer Marty Raybon along with veteran Nashville writer Bob McDill.  It was released in February 1994 as the third single from their album Under the Kudzu.  It was a Number One hit in both the United States and Canada.

Music video
The music video was directed by Roger Pistole, and premiered in early 1994.

Chart performance
"If Bubba Can Dance (I Can Too)" debuted at number 74 on the U.S. Billboard Hot Country Singles & Tracks for the week of February 12, 1994.

Year-end charts

References

1993 songs
Shenandoah (band) songs
1994 singles
Songs written by Bob McDill
Song recordings produced by Don Cook
RCA Records singles